Eustace Sutherland Campbell Percy, 1st Baron Percy of Newcastle, PC (21 March 1887 – 3 April 1958), styled Lord Eustace Percy between 1899 and 1953, was a British diplomat, Conservative politician and public servant. He most notably served as President of the Board of Education under Stanley Baldwin between 1924 and 1929.

Background and education
Percy was born into a noble family: he was the seventh son of Henry Percy, 7th Duke of Northumberland, and Lady Edith, daughter of George Campbell, 8th Duke of Argyll. Henry Percy, Earl Percy, and Alan Percy, 8th Duke of Northumberland, were his elder brothers. His uncle, the ninth Duke of Argyll, was married to Princess Louise, daughter of Queen Victoria. A niece later married the sixth Duke of Sutherland. He was educated at Eton and Christ Church, Oxford.

Political career
Percy served in the Diplomatic Service between 1911 and 1919. From 1919 to 1922 he represented Holborn on the London County Council as a Municipal Reform Party councillor. In 1921 he was elected Member of Parliament (MP) for Hastings, a seat he held until 1937. In March 1923 he was appointed Parliamentary Secretary to the Board of Education by Bonar Law. When Stanley Baldwin became Prime Minister in May of the same year, Percy was moved to the post of Parliamentary Secretary to the Ministry of Health, which he remained until the fall of the government in January 1924.

When the Conservatives returned to power in November 1924, he was appointed President of the Board of Education by Baldwin, with a seat in the cabinet, and sworn of the Privy Council. He continued as head of the Board of Education until the government fell in June 1929.

Percy did not serve in the National Government of Ramsay MacDonald between 1931 and 1935, but when Baldwin returned as Prime Minister in June 1935 he again became a member of the cabinet as Minister without Portfolio, a post he held until 1936. Given charge of policy direction for the government in the latter role, he was often dubbed the "Minister for Thought" by the Press. In the 1930s he called for regional government for the North East of England, specifically wishing to be the minister for the region.

In his 1944 Riddell Lecture, Percy made a call for the law to be changed radically to recognise companies as associations of productive employees, rather than as associations of shareholders. These were his words: "Here is the most important challenge to political invention ever offered to the jurist or the statesman. The human association which in fact produces and distributes wealth, the association of workmen, managers, technicians and directors is not an association recognised by law. The association which the law does recognise - the association of shareholders, creditors and directors - is incapable of producing and distributing and is not expected to perform these functions. We have to give law to the real association and withdraw meaningless privilege from the imaginary one."

In 1945, Percy chaired the committee on Higher Technological Education that resulted in the Percy Report. He also chaired a Royal Commission that reviewed mental health legislation in the 1950s and was Rector of King's College, Durham (now Newcastle University) between 1937 and 1951, in which role he also alternated in the post of Vice-Chancellor of Durham University. In 1953 he was raised to the peerage as Baron Percy of Newcastle, of Etchingham in the County of Sussex.

Family
Percy married Stella Katherine, daughter of Major-General Laurence George Drummond, in 1918. They had two daughters. He died in April 1958, aged 71. As he had no sons the barony became extinct on his death.

References

External links 
 
 

 

1887 births
1958 deaths
1
Conservative Party (UK) MPs for English constituencies
Members of the Privy Council of the United Kingdom
UK MPs 1918–1922
UK MPs 1922–1923
UK MPs 1923–1924
UK MPs 1924–1929
UK MPs 1929–1931
UK MPs 1931–1935
UK MPs 1935–1945
UK MPs who were granted peerages
British Secretaries of State
British Secretaries of State for Education
Younger sons of dukes
Eustace Percy, 01st Baron Percy of Newcastle
Members of London County Council
Municipal Reform Party politicians
James Tait Black Memorial Prize recipients
People educated at Eton College
Hereditary barons created by Elizabeth II